Taha Mortazavi SorkhKolaei (born 28 May 1988) is an Iranian professional futsal player.

Honours

Country 
 Asian Indoor and Martial Arts Games
 Champion (2): 2009 - 2013

Club 
 AFC Futsal Club Championship
 Runner-Up (1): 2013 (Giti Pasand)
 Iranian Futsal Super League
 Runners-up (1): 2013–14 (Giti Pasand)

International goals

References 

1988 births
Living people
Sportspeople from Sari, Iran
Iranian men's futsal players
Futsal forwards
Shahrvand Sari FSC players
Giti Pasand FSC players
Shahrdari Saveh FSC players